Viscount Dunrossil, of Vallaquie in the Isle of North Uist in the County of Inverness, is a title in the Peerage of the United Kingdom. It was created on 12 November 1959 for the Conservative politician William Morrison upon his retirement as Speaker of the House of Commons. His son, the second Viscount, notably served as High Commissioner to Fiji and as Governor of Bermuda.  the title is held by the latter's son, the third Viscount, who succeeded in 2000.

The viscountcy is the most recently created hereditary peerage created for a former Speaker which is still extant; all Speakers of the Commons after the 1st Viscount either received life peerages, died in office, or, having received a hereditary peerage, died without issue.

The family seat is Dunrossil House, near Lochmaddy, Isle of the North Uist.

Viscounts Dunrossil (1959)
William Morrison, 1st Viscount Dunrossil (1893–1961)
John William Morrison, 2nd Viscount Dunrossil (1926–2000)
Andrew William Reginald Morrison, 3rd Viscount Dunrossil (born 1953)

The heir apparent is the present holder's son, the Hon. Callum Alasdair Brundage Morrison (born 1994)

Line of succession

  William Shepherd Morrison, 1st Viscount Dunrossil (1893–1961)
  John William Morrison, 2nd Viscount Dunrossil (1926–2000)
  Andrew William Reginald Morrison, 3rd Viscount Dunrossil (born 1953)
 (1) Hon. Callum Alasdair Brundage Morrison (born 1994)
 (2) Hon. Ranald John Morrison (born 1956)
 (3) Richard Donald Morrison (born 1983)
 (4) Alexander Thomas Morrison (born 1988)
 (5) Hon. Alasdair Godfrey Morrison (born 1962)
 Hon. Alasdair Andrew Orr Morrison (1929–2009)
 (6) William Alasdair Ewing Morrison (born 1960)
 Rev. Hon. Nial Ranald Morrison (1932–1991) (7) Neil William Alexander Morrison (born 1961)
 (8) Alexander Morrison (born 1997)
 (9) Cade Morrison (born 2001)
 (10) John Forbes Morrison (born 1963)
 (11) Niall Morrison (born 2002)
 (12) Hugh Robert Shepherd Morrison (born 1965)

Arms

Notes

References
Kidd, Charles & Williamson, David (editors). Debrett's Peerage and Baronetage'' (1990 edition). New York: St Martin's Press, 1990, 

Viscountcies in the Peerage of the United Kingdom
Noble titles created in 1959
Peerages created for the Speaker of the House of Commons
Noble titles created for UK MPs